"There Must Be More to Life Than This" is the eighth track on Queen singer Freddie Mercury's debut solo album Mr. Bad Guy, released on 29 April 1985 by Columbia Records.

The song was originally recorded by Queen for 1982's Hot Space, but failed to make the final version of the album. It was previously recorded as a duet between Mercury and Michael Jackson, along with two other songs: "State of Shock" (later reworked with Mick Jagger for a version by the Jacksons) and "Victory" (which remains unreleased).

Queen and Michael Jackson version

After Michael Jackson's death in 2009, Queen guitarist Brian May and drummer Roger Taylor took steps to secure all three Mercury/Jackson duets, with a view to releasing them in 2012. However, Taylor likened dealing with the Michael Jackson Estate to "wading through glue". Eventually, the parties agreed for "There Must Be More to Life Than This" alone to be released. "I was very pleased we had three new tracks to put on Queen Forever," said Taylor. "As well as the Michael Jackson track 'There Must Be More to Life than This', there is another song Freddie did with him, called 'State of Shock', with a massive rock sound. But we could only have one track with Michael, which is a great shame."

A contributing factor to the delay from the time it was recorded was Mercury's frustration over Jackson's insistence that his pet llama be allowed to attend recording sessions. According to manager Jim Beach Mercury told him "Can you get me out of here. I'm recording with a llama." Jackson wasn't keen on Mercury's recreational drug use during their recording sessions. Mercury returned to London soon after and the track remained unfinished.

The version on Queen Forever was produced and mixed by William Orbit, containing the original backing track from the Hot Space sessions with May on guitar, Taylor on drums and John Deacon on bass. An alternative mix by May was rejected in favour of Orbit's. A solo version recorded by Jackson has been recorded and leaked but remains unreleased.

Personnel
Freddie Mercury - lead and backing vocals, piano
Brian May - guitar
John Deacon - bass guitar
Roger Taylor - drums, percussion
Michael Jackson - co-lead vocals

Charts

References

1985 songs
2014 songs
Freddie Mercury songs
Song recordings produced by William Orbit
Songs written by Freddie Mercury
Queen (band) songs
Michael Jackson songs
Male vocal duets